Powell Lake is a lake in the northern Sunshine Coast region of British Columbia, Canada, adjacent to the city of Powell River, which sits on the low rise of land forming a natural dam between the lake and the Strait of Georgia.  The lake flows to the ocean through Powell River and features Goat Island, a large mountainous island.  It serves as a reservoir for a small hydroelectric generating station which was built to serve the city's paper mill, and also as a water supply for that paper mill.

Name origin
The lake was named for Israel Wood Powell, Indian Commissioner for British Columbia 1872–1889.

Indigenous history
"According to John Hackett, Hegus (“Chief,” in the Sliammon language) of the Tla’amin Nation, the Tla’amin people had, at that time, a main village called Tis’kwat located in that exact spot. But the people started seeing European settlers coming into their territory, setting up camps and eventually starting to log and extract resources from the area."
However, any evidence will likely be found under the current waters of Powell Lake, since it was only a river system meandering between mountainous valleys before the dam at the river head was built to provide power for the timber mill and a floating highway  to deliver logs from cutting areas in the adjacent mountains.
One view is that the original Powell River was a salmon breeding ground before settlement and logging interests dammed the waters use, suggesting ecological, cultural and geographical desirability for native settlement on the life giving river close to the ocean.

However, there is no doubt that one time Powell Lake was once an ocean inlet as it contains ancient salt water at its deepest points, some of which are more than 500m.  Geologists posit that the mouth of Powell Lake rebounded with the recession of glaciers at the end of the last Ice Age, creating a fresh water barrier system, which led to the destruction of its salmon runs and its becoming a fresh water lake. If there were indigenous communities based on salmon runs in that system, that must have been many thousands of years ago.

References

Sunshine Coast (British Columbia)
Lakes of British Columbia